Norman Gale (24 July 1939 – 30 January 2005) was a Welsh rugby union player. A hooker, he captained the Wales national rugby union team on two occasions in 1967–68. Gale played his club rugby for Llanelli RFC and Swansea RFC, but it was with the Scarlets of Llanelli that he is most associated. He captained Llanelli over two seasons, 1964–65 and 1967–68, and coached the team in the 1973–74 season. Gale earned his place Welsh Rugby history when he became the last Hooker to score a penalty in an international when he kicked one against New Zealand in 1967. He was a good player.

Notes

1939 births
2005 deaths
Gorseinon RFC players
Llanelli RFC players
People educated at Gowerton Grammar School
Publicans
Rugby union hookers
Rugby union players from Gorseinon
Swansea RFC players
Wales international rugby union players
Wales rugby union captains
Welsh rugby union coaches
Welsh rugby union players